Nemamyxine is a genus of hagfish.

Species
Two recognized species are placed in this genus:
 Nemamyxine elongata L. R. Richardson, 1958 (bootlace hagfish) 
 Nemamyxine kreffti C. B. McMillan & Wisner, 1982 (Krefft's hagfish)

References

Myxinidae
jawless fish genera